

Belgium
 Congo Free State – Camille Janssen, Governor-General of the Congo Free State (1886–1891)

France
 French Somaliland – Léonce Lagarde, Governor of French Somaliland (1888–1899)
 Riviéres du Sud – Jean-Marie Bayol, Lieutenant-Governor of Riviéres du Sud (1882–1891)

Portugal
 Angola – Gilherme Auguste de Brito Capelo, Governor-General of Angola (1886–1892)

United Kingdom
 British Virgin Islands – Edward John Cameron, Administrator of the British Virgin Islands (1887–1894)
 Falkland Islands – Thomas Kerr, Governor of the Falkland Islands (1887–1891)
 Malta Colony – Henry Augustus Smyth, Governor of Malta (1890–1893)
 New South Wales – Charles Wynn-Carington, Lord Lincolnshire, Governor of New South Wales (1885–1890)
 Queensland – Field Marshal Sir Henry Norman, Governor of Queensland (1889–1895)
 Tasmania – Robert Hamilton, Governor of Tasmania (1887–1892)
 South Australia – Algernon Keith-Falconer, Lord Kintore, Governor of South Australia (1889–1895)
 Victoria – John Hope, Earl of Hopetoun, Governor of Victoria (1889–1895)
 Western Australia 
 Sir Frederick Broome, Governor of Western Australia (1883–1890)
 Sir William Robinson, Governor of Western Australia (1890–1895)

Colonial governors
Colonial governors
1890